The Three Godfathers is a 1913 novel by American author Peter B. Kyne, about a trio of bank robbers who become godfathers to a newborn child. The story was originally published in The Saturday Evening Post (November 23, 1912), illustrated by N. C. Wyeth.

Plot summary
Four men rob a bank in Wickenburg, Arizona.  One man is shot and killed, and the other three flee to the wilderness. One of the fleeing men has a gunshot wound in his shoulder.
They encounter a woman in labor in a covered wagon who delivers a baby, entrusts the child to the men's care (asking them all to act as godfathers to the child), and then dies.  The men then try to get the baby back to civilization;
two of them die on the way due to the lack of water. The final man, suffering from extreme thirst, carries the baby to the town of New Jerusalem, pursued doggedly by coyotes and aided by a burro.

Characters
 Tom Gibbons, referred to as The Worst Bad Man
 Bill Kearney, referred to as The Wounded Bad Man
 Bob Sangster, referred to as The Youngest Bad Man
 the woman
 Robert William Thomas Sangster, the baby

Adaptations
The novel has been adapted into films multiple times:

 The Sheriff's Baby, a 1913 Biograph film directed by D.W. Griffith and starring Harry Carey, Lionel Barrymore and Henry B. Walthall.

 The Three Godfathers, a 1916 film with Harry Carey
Marked Men a 1919 remake of the 1916 film, also starring Harry Carey, considered a lost film
Action, a lost 1921 film
 Hell's Heroes, a 1929 film directed by William Wyler
 Hells Heels, a 1930 Oswald the Lucky Rabbit animated short directed by Walter Lantz
 Three Godfathers, a 1936 film featuring Chester Morris
 3 Godfathers, a 1948 film starring John Wayne
 Tokyo Godfathers, a 2003 Japanese animated film loosely based on the novel

See also
 Ice Age (2002), a computer-animated film directed by Chris Wedge for Blue Sky Studios with a similar plot

References

External links
 The Three Godfathers at archive.org
  

1913 American novels
Western (genre) novels
American novels adapted into films
Works originally published in The Saturday Evening Post